Dirphia horcana is a moth of the  family Saturniidae. It is found in Costa Rica and Panama.

References

Moths described in 1911
Saturniidae
Moths of Central America